Sir Robin St John Knowles CBE (born 7 April 1960), styled The Hon. Mr Justice Knowles, is a judge of the High Court of England and Wales.

He was educated at Sir Roger Manwood's School and Trinity College, Cambridge.

He was called to the bar at Middle Temple in 1982. He has been a judge of the High Court of Justice (King's Bench Division) since 1 October 2014.

References

1960 births
Living people
People educated at Sir Roger Manwood's School
Alumni of Trinity College, Cambridge
Members of the Middle Temple
Queen's Bench Division judges
Commanders of the Order of the British Empire
Knights Bachelor